The Wanted Life is an American reality television series that follows the British-Irish boy band group The Wanted. The series premiered June 2, 2013, on E! Announced on February 6, 2013, The Wanted Life chronicles the five piece band as they record their third album and plan their first world tour. Despite acquiring 600,000 viewers for its inaugural 10 p.m. premiere,  The Wanted Life was able to achieve 1.7 million viewers after three reruns of the series throughout the same night.

Cast

Episodes

Awards and nominations

International broadcast 
The series premiered on E! Australia on 9 July 2013.

References

External links

2010s American reality television series
2013 American television series debuts
2013 American television series endings
Celebrity reality television series
English-language television shows
E! original programming
Television series by Ryan Seacrest Productions
Television series based on singers and musicians
Television shows set in Los Angeles
The Wanted